Garland D. Frazier (April 5, 1917 – January 11, 1991) was an American football, basketball, and track and field coach.  He served as the head football coach at Hanover College in Hanover, Indiana from 1949 to 1950 and Wabash College in Crawfordsville, Indiana from 1951 to 1960, compiling a career college football coaching record of 59–40–7.  Frazier was also the head basketball coach at Hanover for one season, in 1949–1950, tallying a mark of 15–11.

Playing career and military service
Frazier attended Bicknell High School in Bicknell, Indiana, where he played football and basketball, before graduating in 1935.  He moved on to Indiana University, lettering for the freshman football team in 1935.  Frazier transferred to Ball State Teachers College—now known as Ball State University—Muncie, Indiana, where played for three seasons as a fullback and lettered in track.

After graduating from Ball State in 1940 with a Bachelor of Science in physical education in 1940, he briefly taught and coached basketball in Guilford, Indiana before joining the United States Navy.  During World War II, he was stationed at Naval Air Station Norman in Norman, Oklahoma.  There he played for the Norman Naval Air Station Zoomers football as a tackle and was a teammate of Emil Sitko, who later started at the University of Notre Dame and in the National Football League (NFL).

Coaching career
After earning a master's degree from the University of Oklahoma, Frazier returned to Bicknell High School in 1946, where he coached football, basketball, and track for three seasons.

Frazier was the 24th head football coach at Wabash College in Crawfordsville, Indiana, serving for ten seasons, from 1951 to 1960, and compiling a record of 48–35–6.

Head coaching record

College football

References

1917 births
1991 deaths
American football fullbacks
American football tackles
Ball State Cardinals football players
Ball State Cardinals men's track and field athletes
Basketball coaches from Indiana
Hanover Panthers football coaches
Hanover Panthers men's basketball coaches
Norman Naval Air Station Zoomers football players
Wabash Little Giants football coaches
College track and field coaches in the United States
High school basketball coaches in Indiana
High school football coaches in Indiana
United States Navy personnel of World War II
University of Oklahoma alumni
Players of American football from Indiana
Track and field athletes from Indiana